Parliamentary elections were held in Norway on 7 and 8 September 1969. Although the Labour Party remained the largest party, winning 74 of the 150 seats, the coalition of right-of-centre parties won 76 seats and retained power. The closeness of the result and fears of the two blocs winning an equal number of seats led to the number of seats being increased to an odd number for the next elections.

Results

Seat distribution

Notes

References

General elections in Norway
1960s elections in Norway
Norway
1969 in Norway
September 1969 events in Europe